The Alive II Tour was a concert tour by Kiss, and was the follow-up to the Love Gun Tour which ended in early September.

History 
The Alive II Tour saw Kiss perform 5 sold-out nights at Tokyo's Budokan, breaking their previous record of 4 one year earlier, as well as breaking the previous record by The Beatles. They also played 3 sold-out nights at Madison Square Garden in their hometown of New York City, and multiple nights in several other cities, including San Antonio; Landover, Maryland; Chicago; Detroit; and Providence, Rhode Island. The audience for the band were mainly young teenage crowds. AC/DC was the opening act for several concerts on this tour. The costumes and stage show were carried over from the Love Gun Tour, with minor changes made to the setlist.

During the show in Pittsburgh, Peter Criss had passed out in the middle of the concert. After a brief intermission, he returned to finish the show with his bandmates. The band would also be snowed in during the show in Richfield.

In the tour program for the band's final tour, Simmons reflected on the tour:

Reception
Barry Paris, a reporter from the Pittsburgh Post-Gazette who attended the Civic Arena show in Pittsburgh, gave the show a positive review, stating: "Kiss (whose members acknowledge that their music is 'nothing profound') is a likable act not so much because of but in spite of its gimmickry. The crucial factor is their good (but not great) musicianship, which amounts to a B-plus/A-minus type of rock 'n roll and gosh darn, how can you not help but like the fresh-faced fans they attract?".

Setlist 
 "I Stole Your Love"
 "King of the Night Time World"
 "Ladies Room"
 "Firehouse"
 "Love Gun"
 "Let Me Go, Rock 'n' Roll"
 "Makin' Love"
 "Christine Sixteen"
 "Shock Me"
 "I Want You"
 "Calling Dr. Love"
 "Shout It Out Loud"
 "God of Thunder"
 "Rock and Roll All Nite"
Encore
 "Detroit Rock City"
 "Beth"
 "Black Diamond"

The setlist for this tour was nearly identical to that of the Love Gun Tour, with the only exceptions being that "King of the Night Time World" and "Let Me Go, Rock 'n' Roll" took the place of "Take Me" and "Hooligan".

Tour dates

Box office score data

Personnel
Paul Stanley – vocals, rhythm guitar
Gene Simmons – vocals, bass
Peter Criss – drums, vocals
Ace Frehley – lead guitar, vocals

References

Sources 

Kiss (band) concert tours
1977 concert tours
1978 concert tours